oOh!media Limited (sometimes written as Ooh!media, oOh! Media or simply Ooh!) is an Australian outdoor advertising and media company based in Sydney, Australia. The company was founded by Brendon Cook as Outdoor Network Australia in 1989, and is one of Australia's largest operators of out of home advertising products.

History
The company was founded in 1989 as an advertising site representation business called Outdoor Network Australia by Brendon Cook. The company listed on the Australian Securities Exchange (ASX) in 2002 as Network Limited (ASX:NWK), rebranding as oOh!media in 2008, following the acquisition of Melbourne based firm Media Puzzle. Also in 2008, it acquired  regional advertising company Sports & Outdoor Media in a $40 million deal.

In 2012, oOh!media was privatised by Champ Private Equity and WWP. Shortly after being privatised, the company acquired EYE Corp from Ten Network Holdings for $145 million (which was later reduced to $113 million).

In December 2014, the oOh!media was floated once again on the ASX, raising $169 million for its shareholders, which prior to listing were Champ (75.5%), WPP (20.3%) and the remainder by management and other stakeholders.

In 2016, oOh!media purchased 85% of Junkee Media for $11 million. It acquired the remaining 15% several years later.

In 2017, oOh!media planned to merge with rival APN Outdoor, however was aborted after the Australian Competition & Consumer Commission raised preliminary concerns.

In June 2018, oOh!media purchased street furniture business Adshel for $570 million from Here, There & Everywhere, in a competitive bidding war against rival APN Outdoor.

In January 2020, founder Brendon Cook announced he would step down as MD and CEO. Cathy O'Connor was announced as the new CEO in August 2020.

In December 2021, oOh!media sold Junkee Media to RACAT Group. oOh!media retained Junkee’s branded content and production arm, Junkee Studio. Junkee Media CEO Neil Ackland remained at oOh!media.

References

External links
 

Companies based in Sydney
Companies listed on the Australian Securities Exchange
Marketing companies established in 1988
Marketing companies of Australia
1988 establishments in Australia